The Duhks is the second studio album by the group The Duhks. It is released under the Sugar Hill Records label.

Track listing

Personnel
Leonard Podolak – banjo and vocals
Tania Elizabeth – fiddle and vocals
Jordan McConnell – guitar and vocals
Jessee Havey – lead vocals
Scott Senior – percussion

References

The Duhks albums
2005 albums
Sugar Hill Records albums